Greeno is a surname. Notable people with the surname include:

Gayle Greeno (born 1949), American writer
James Greeno (1935–2020), American educational psychologist
Lola Greeno (born 1946), Australian artist
Rollie Greeno (1928–2010), American football coach

See also